Eero Olavi Saari (born 18 September 1928) is a Finnish retired professional ice hockey player who played with the Tampereen Ilves of the SM-liiga and with the Finnish national team. He represented Finland at the 1951 Ice Hockey World Championships and in the ice hockey tournament at the 1952 Winter Olympics.

Saari was inducted into the Hockey Hall of Fame Finland in 1994. He was named an Ilves Hockey Legend in a ceremony held on 7 March 2020. He is remembered as the first player on the Finnish national team to score a goal against Canada.

References

External links

1928 births
Living people
Ice hockey people from Tampere
Finnish ice hockey forwards
Ilves players
Ice hockey players at the 1952 Winter Olympics
Olympic ice hockey players of Finland